Sheree Wingard (born 18 August 1988) is an Australian netball player in the ANZ Championship, playing for the Adelaide Thunderbirds. She started her netball career playing for a small, but successful club, Cheerio Eagles. She is also a student studying Primary and Junior Primary Teaching.

References
2008 Adelaide Thunderbirds profile. Retrieved on 2008-07-17.

1988 births
Living people
Australian netball players
Adelaide Thunderbirds players
ANZ Championship players
Australian Netball League players
Southern Force (netball) players
South Australian Sports Institute netball players
Netball players from South Australia